The 1913 Pyrenees Cup was the 4th tournament of the Pyrenees Cup, one of the first international football club competitions. The competition was held on the road between 2 March and 8 June, and it was won by FC Barcelona after easily disposing of La Comète et Simiot 7–2 in the final at Camp de la Indústria.

Participants
Originally, the tournament was to be contested by 7 teams, however, the 1912–13 season saw a split in Spanish football, with several Spanish teams led by Barcelona and Real Sociedad, announcing their departure from the Federación Española de Clubs de Fútbol (FECF) (the forerunner for the Royal Spanish Football Federation, RFEF) and created a new institution, the Unión Española de Clubs de Fútbol (UECF). Of the Catalan clubs registered at the tournament, RCD Espanyol, FC Espanya and Casual SC were loyal to the original institutions (FECF), questioning whether teams from different federations (such as Barça from UECF) could participate in the same international competition, and eventually, FC Espanya did not accept the entry of FC Barcelona and forfeited the match against RCD Espanyol, who together with Casual SC decided to participate in spite of Barcelona's entry. Interestingly, the Catalan Football Federation penalized Casual SC for playing against FC Barcelona, but not RCD Espanyol.

Tournament
FC Barcelona won the tournament after thrashing Casual SC 7–0 in the quarter-finals with a hat-trick from Alexander Steel, and then La Comète et Simiot 7–2 in the final with goals from José Berdié (2), Paulino Alcántara (2) and Alfredo Massana. However, their triumph was wrapped up in controversy as they actually lost the semi-finals 1–3 to RCD Espanyol, courtesy of a brace from Antonio Morales, a former Barça player; but the Blaugrana managed to have the result being annulled through protests about the improper use of British players.

Results

Quarter-finals

Semi-final

Barcelona played the second half with 10 players due to a tackle by S. Massana on Steel that prevented him from continuing to play, and Espanyol took full advantage of it to win 3–1, thus becoming the first team in the history of the competition to beat Barcelona, but Barça protested against the fact that Espanyol had fielded three British players brought by them from the United Kingdom only to play the match, and their protest was upheld resulting in Espanyol being disqualified and FC Barcelona reaching the final yet again.

Final

Statistics

Top Scorers

See also
 1895 World Championship
 1900 Coupe Van der Straeten Ponthoz
 1909 Sir Thomas Lipton Trophy

References

Copa Catalunya seasons
1912–13 in European football
Defunct international club association football competitions in Europe
1912–13 in Spanish football
1912–13 in French football